A bartender is one who serves beverages behind a bar at a drinking or dining establishment.

Bartender may also refer to:

Bartender (manga), a 2004 Japanese manga series
"Bartender", a 2000 single by Hed PE from Broke
"Bartender" (Dave Matthews Band song), 2002
"Bartender" (T-Pain song), 2007
"Bartender Song (Sittin' at a Bar)", a 2008 song by Rehab
"Bartender" (Lady Antebellum song), 2014
 "Bartender" (James Blunt song), 2017
"Bartender" (Lana Del Rey song), 2019